Per Roger Lauritzen (born 1956) is Norwegian non-fiction writer. He hails from Asker. He has worked as an editor for the Norwegian Trekking Association for more than thirty years, and has published more than fifty books. He was awarded Den norske friluftslivprisen in 2007, jointly with Leif Ryvarden.

References

1956 births
Living people
People from Asker
Norwegian non-fiction writers
Norwegian nature writers